List of Baccharis species — in the flowering plant family Asteraceae.

Species
Accepted Species:

Baccharis acaulis
Baccharis alamosana
Baccharis albida
Baccharis albilanosa
Baccharis alboffii
Baccharis aliena
Baccharis aliens
Baccharis alleluia
Baccharis alnifolia
Baccharis alpestris
Baccharis alpina
Baccharis altimontana
Baccharis amambayensis
Baccharis angusticeps
Baccharis angustifolia
Baccharis anomala
Baccharis angustior
Baccharis antioquensis
Baccharis antucensis
Baccharis aphylla
Baccharis apicifoliosa
Baccharis aracatubaensis
Baccharis arbutifolia
Baccharis arcuata
Baccharis arenaria
Baccharis aretioides
Baccharis arguta
Baccharis arizonica
Baccharis artemisioides
Baccharis articulata
Baccharis asperula
Baccharis auriculigera
Baccharis australis
Baccharis axillaris
Baccharis ayacuchensis
Baccharis barragensis
Baccharis beckii
Baccharis bicolor
Baccharis bifrons
Baccharis bigelovii
Baccharis bogotensis
Baccharis boliviensis
Baccharis boyacensis
Baccharis brachyphylla
Baccharis brachystachys
Baccharis bracteolata
Baccharis brevifolia
Baccharis breviseta
Baccharis buchtienii
Baccharis buddlejoides
Baccharis burchellii
Baccharis buxifolia
Baccharis cabrerae
Baccharis caespitosa
Baccharis caldasiana
Baccharis calvescens
Baccharis campos-portoana
Baccharis cana
Baccharis canescens
Baccharis capitalensis
Baccharis caprariifolia
Baccharis caramavidensis
'"Baccharis cataphractaBaccharis chachapoyasensisBaccharis charucoensisBaccharis chilcauraBaccharis chilcoBaccharis chillanensisBaccharis chionolaenoidesBaccharis chiquitosBaccharis ciliataBaccharis cinereaBaccharis clausseniiBaccharis clavataBaccharis cochensisBaccharis cognataBaccharis concavaBaccharis concavoidesBaccharis confertaBaccharis confertifoliaBaccharis confertoidesBaccharis conyzoidesBaccharis cordataBaccharis coridifoliaBaccharis coronataBaccharis corymbosaBaccharis cotinifoliumBaccharis crassicuneataBaccharis crassipappaBaccharis crenatolycioidesBaccharis cultrataBaccharis cundinamarcensisBaccharis curitybensisBaccharis cutervensisBaccharis cyanosaBaccharis cymosaBaccharis darwiniiBaccharis davidsoniiBaccharis debleiBaccharis decurrensBaccharis decussataBaccharis deltoideaBaccharis demissaBaccharis densaBaccharis densifloraBaccharis dentataBaccharis dependensBaccharis dichotomaBaccharis dioicaBaccharis divaricataBaccharis dracunculifolia Baccharis dubiaBaccharis dunensis Baccharis effusaBaccharis elaeoides Baccharis elliptica Baccharis emarginata Baccharis erectifolia Baccharis erigeroides Baccharis erioclada Baccharis erosoricola Baccharis espadaeBaccharis exspectataBaccharis exyngioidesBaccharis famatinensisBaccharis farallonensisBaccharis flabellataBaccharis flexuosiramosaBaccharis floccosaBaccharis floribundoidesBaccharis fraternaBaccharis fraudulentaBaccharis frenguelliiBaccharis friburgensisBaccharis fuscaBaccharis gaudichaudianaBaccharis genistelloidesBaccharis genistifoliaBaccharis gibertiiBaccharis gilliesiiBaccharis glabraBaccharis glabrataBaccharis glaucaBaccharis glaucescensBaccharis glazioviiBaccharis glomerataBaccharis glomerulifloraBaccharis glutinosaBaccharis gnaphalioidesBaccharis gnidiifoliaBaccharis gracilisBaccharis granadinaBaccharis grandifloraBaccharis grandimucronataBaccharis grisebachiiBaccharis haitiensisBaccharis halimifoliaBaccharis hambatensisBaccharis havardiiBaccharis helichrysoidesBaccharis hemipteraBaccharis herbaceaBaccharis heterophyllaBaccharis hieronymiBaccharis hirtaBaccharis horizontalisBaccharis huairacajensisBaccharis humifusaBaccharis humilisBaccharis hutchisoniiBaccharis hyemalisBaccharis hypericifoliaBaccharis illinitaBaccharis illinitoidesBaccharis inamoenaBaccharis incisaBaccharis inexspectataBaccharis intermediaBaccharis intermixtaBaccharis itapirocensisBaccharis itatiaiaeBaccharis jochenianaBaccharis johnwurdackianaBaccharis junceaBaccharis junciformisBaccharis kingiiBaccharis klattiiBaccharis kurtzianaBaccharis lancifoliaBaccharis lateralisBaccharis latifoliaBaccharis ledifoliaBaccharis lehmanniiBaccharis leptocephalaBaccharis leptospermoidesBaccharis leucocephalaBaccharis leucopappaBaccharis lewisiiBaccharis libertadensisBaccharis ligustrinaBaccharis lilloiBaccharis linearifoliaBaccharis linearisBaccharis longiattenuataBaccharis lundiiBaccharis lychnophoraBaccharis lycioidesBaccharis lymaniiBaccharis macraeiBaccharis macrocephalaBaccharis macrophyllaBaccharis magellanicaBaccharis magnificaBaccharis malibuensisBaccharis malmeiBaccharis mandoniiBaccharis marcetiifoliaBaccharis maritimaBaccharis martianaBaccharis maximaBaccharis megapotamicaBaccharis melanopotamicaBaccharis meridensiBaccharis mesoneuraBaccharis mexicanaBaccharis meyenianaBaccharis micranthaBaccharis microcephalaBaccharis microdontaBaccharis millefloraBaccharis minutifloraBaccharis mocoafluminisBaccharis mollisBaccharis monoicaBaccharis montanaBaccharis moritzianaBaccharis multibracteataBaccharis multifloraBaccharis multifoliaBaccharis mutisianaBaccharis mylodontisBaccharis myricifoliaBaccharis myrsinitesBaccharis napaeaBaccharis neaeiBaccharis nebularisBaccharis neglectaBaccharis nervosaBaccharis niederleiniiBaccharis nipensisBaccharis nitidaBaccharis nivalisBaccharis notosergilaBaccharis nummulariaBaccharis oblongifoliaBaccharis obovataBaccharis occidentalisBaccharis ochraceaBaccharis oleifoliaBaccharis opuntioidesBaccharis orbiculataBaccharis orbignyanaBaccharis oreophilaBaccharis organensisBaccharis orientalisBaccharis oxyodontaBaccharis pachycephalaBaccharis padifoliaBaccharis palmeriBaccharis palustrisBaccharis pampeanaBaccharis paniculataBaccharis papillosaBaccharis paramicolaBaccharis paranensisBaccharis parvidentataBaccharis parvifoliaBaccharis pascensisBaccharis patagonicaBaccharis patensBaccharis paucicostataBaccharis pauciflosculosaBaccharis pederseniiBaccharis pedunculataBaccharis pellucidaBaccharis pendontaBaccharis penningtoniiBaccharis pentapteraBaccharis pentlandiiBaccharis pentodontaBaccharis perulataBaccharis petrophilaBaccharis philipensisBaccharis phlogopappaBaccharis phylicifoliaBaccharis phylicoidesBaccharis phyteumaBaccharis phyteumoidesBaccharis pilcensisBaccharis pilularisBaccharis pingralaBaccharis platypodaBaccharis plummeraeBaccharis pluricapitulataBaccharis pohliiBaccharis polifoliaBaccharis polygamaBaccharis polyphyllaBaccharis potosiensisBaccharis potrerillanaBaccharis praetermissaBaccharis prunifoliaBaccharis pseudoalpestrisBaccharis pseudolycioidesBaccharis pseudomyriocephalaBaccharis pseudoneaeiBaccharis pseudopalenaeBaccharis pseudopilcensisBaccharis pseudotenuifoliaBaccharis pseudovaccinioidesBaccharis pseudovillosaBaccharis psiadioidesBaccharis ptarmicifoliaBaccharis pteronioidesBaccharis pulchellaBaccharis pululahuensisBaccharis pumilaBaccharis punctulataBaccharis pycnanthaBaccharis quitensisBaccharis racemosaBaccharis ramboiBaccharis ramifloraBaccharis rauliiBaccharis regnelliiBaccharis retamoidesBaccharis reticulariaBaccharis reticularioidesBaccharis reticulataBaccharis retusaBaccharis revolutaBaccharis rhomboidalisBaccharis riograndensisBaccharis rivularisBaccharis rodrigueziiBaccharis rosmarinusBaccharis rotundifoliaBaccharis rufidulaBaccharis rupestrisBaccharis rupicolaBaccharis sagittalisBaccharis salicifoliaBaccharis salicinaBaccharis saliensBaccharis samensisBaccharis santiagensisBaccharis sarothroidesBaccharis saxatilisBaccharis scabraBaccharis scabridulaBaccharis scabrifoliaBaccharis scandensBaccharis schomburgkiiBaccharis scopariaBaccharis scopulorumBaccharis sculptaBaccharis seemanniiBaccharis selloiBaccharis semiserrataBaccharis septentrionalisBaccharis sergiloidesBaccharis serranoiBaccharis serrifoliaBaccharis serrulaBaccharis serrulataBaccharis sessiliflora Baccharis sessilifolia Baccharis singularisBaccharis sinuataBaccharis sordescensBaccharis sparteaBaccharis spartioidesBaccharis spegazziniiBaccharis sphaerocephalaBaccharis sphagnophilaBaccharis sphenophyllaBaccharis spicataBaccharis steetziiBaccharis stenophyllaBaccharis stuebeliiBaccharis stylosaBaccharis subaequalisBaccharis subalataBaccharis subbimeraBaccharis subdentataBaccharis suberectifoliaBaccharis suboppositaBaccharis subtropicalisBaccharis sulcataBaccharis supplexBaccharis taltalensisBaccharis tarapacanaBaccharis tarchonanthoidesBaccharis tarmensisBaccharis teindalensisBaccharis tenellaBaccharis tenuicapitulataBaccharis tenuifoliaBaccharis texanaBaccharis thesioidesBaccharis thymifoliaBaccharis tomentosaBaccharis torricoiBaccharis toxicariaBaccharis triangularisBaccharis tricuneataBaccharis tridentataBaccharis trilobataBaccharis trimeroidesBaccharis trineuraBaccharis truncataBaccharis tucumanensisBaccharis uleanaBaccharis ulicinaBaccharis umbellataBaccharis uncinellaBaccharis unifloraBaccharis urvilleanaBaccharis vacciniifoliaBaccharis vaccinioidesBaccharis vanessaeBaccharis venosaBaccharis venulosoidesBaccharis vernalisBaccharis vernicosaBaccharis vincifoliaBaccharis vismioidesBaccharis vitis-idaeaBaccharis volubilisBaccharis vulnerariaBaccharis wagenitziiBaccharis weiriiBaccharis wendlandiiBaccharis woodiiBaccharis wrightiiBaccharis xiphophyllaBaccharis zamoranensisBaccharis zamudiorumBaccharis zoellneriBaccharis zongoensisBaccharis zumbadorensis''

Baccharis

References